Hazelwood is an unincorporated community in Webster Township, Rice County, Minnesota, United States.

The community is located at the junction of Rice County Roads 3 and 46, near Interstate 35, 15 miles north of Faribault.

Dutch Creek flows through the community.  Nearby places also include Lonsdale, Elko New Market, and Northfield.

ZIP codes 55088 (Webster) and 55057 (Northfield) meet near Hazelwood.

Hazelwood had a post office from 1857 to 1905, which was operated out of postmaster John J. McCabe's general store.

References

Unincorporated communities in Minnesota
Unincorporated communities in Rice County, Minnesota
1857 establishments in Minnesota Territory
Populated places established in 1857